Vítor Manuel Lima Santos (born 10 August 1981) is a Portuguese retired professional footballer who played as a midfielder.

Club career

Early years
Aged 19, Guimarães-born Lima left his country and joined UD Salamanca in Spain. He would never appear officially for the first team, also being loaned to modest Zamora CF, and left the Castile and León club in 2001.

In the following four seasons, Lima played in the Portuguese third division with Clube Caçadores das Taipas – three years – and Académico de Viseu FC.

Falkirk
On 15 June 2005, free agent Lima signed for Falkirk alongside compatriot Tiago Jonas, being discovered by the team's player-coach Russell Latapy who had spent several seasons in Portugal as a player. He made his Scottish Premier League debut on 6 August, playing the full 90 minutes in a 2–0 away win against Livingston.

On 28 April 2006, Lima extended his contract with the Bairns for a further season. He left the club in summer 2007 after making 42 competitive appearances (30 starts), hoping to "return to Portugal".

Greece, return to Scotland
Lima joined Greek second tier club Ethnikos Piraeus F.C. in June 2007. He often started during his tenure.

On 30 July 2009, Lima returned to Falkirk on a one-year deal. He missed several games during the campaign due to a knee injury, with the side eventually being relegated from the top flight after ranking 12th and last, following which he was released.

Later career
Lima return to Greece and its division two for 2010–11, helping Doxa Drama F.C. to promote to the Super League. In the 2012 off-season he moved to neighbouring Cyprus, signing with Ethnikos Achna FC.

On 12 July 2013, Lima moved to Iraklis Thessaloniki F.C. of the Greek second division. On 7 June of the following year he was supposed to sign for another team in the country, Agrotikos Asteras FC, but the deal eventually fell through.

Lima retired in July 2018 at the age of 37 after four seasons with F.C. Famalicão (where he often acted as captain), the last three spent in the Portuguese second tier. He immediately joined their coaching staff.

References

External links

1981 births
Living people
Sportspeople from Guimarães
Portuguese footballers
Association football midfielders
Liga Portugal 2 players
Segunda Divisão players
Vitória S.C. players
Clube Caçadores das Taipas players
Académico de Viseu F.C. players
F.C. Famalicão players
Segunda División B players
UD Salamanca players
Zamora CF footballers
Scottish Premier League players
Falkirk F.C. players
Super League Greece players
Football League (Greece) players
Ethnikos Piraeus F.C. players
Doxa Drama F.C. players
Iraklis Thessaloniki F.C. players
Cypriot First Division players
Ethnikos Achna FC players
Portugal youth international footballers
Portuguese expatriate footballers
Expatriate footballers in Spain
Expatriate footballers in Scotland
Expatriate footballers in Greece
Expatriate footballers in Cyprus
Portuguese expatriate sportspeople in Spain
Portuguese expatriate sportspeople in Scotland
Portuguese expatriate sportspeople in Greece
Portuguese expatriate sportspeople in Cyprus